The cloudy gecko (Mokopirirakau nebulosus) is a species of gecko  that is endemic to New Zealand. It is found on Stewart Island and outlying islands. It is an arboreal species which prefers a cold, wet climate. Its appearance is very similar in pattern and colour to the forest gecko (M. granulatus); however, there is usually more green and brown rather than grey, and the pattern is less distinct.

References

 Mokopirirakau nebulosus - Cloudy gecko at the New Zealand Herpetological Society

Reptiles of New Zealand
Mokopirirakau
Reptiles described in 1955
Taxa named by Charles McCann